Krystal Ladawn Covel Sandubrae, known professionally as Krystal Keith (born September 30, 1985) is an American country music singer. She is the second daughter of Toby Keith and Tricia Covel (née Lucus). She is the sister of Stelen Keith Covel, the maternal half-sister of Shelley Covel Rowland (whom Toby Keith adopted upon his marriage to Tricia), and the wife of Andrew Robert Sandubrae (whom she married on October 23, 2010).

Music career
Her first chart entry was in 2004, when she sang duet vocals with her father on a cover of Inez and Charlie Foxx's "Mockingbird" which appeared on his 2004 album Greatest Hits 2. She also sang the song with him at the 2004 Country Music Association awards. After this song was released, Keith attended college at her father's insistence. She graduated from the University of Oklahoma.

In mid-2013, she signed to Show Dog-Universal Music. She released a four-song extended play, which includes her debut single "Daddy Dance with Me". She wrote the song as a surprise to her father and performed it for the first time on the day of her wedding. The song is included on her debut album Whiskey & Lace, produced by her father and Mark Wright. The EP received a positive review from Daryl Addison of Great American Country, who called her a "confident young singer with a strong voice". The second single from Whiskey & Lace, "Get Your Redneck On", was released to country radio on September 30, 2013.

Personal life
Keith is married and has two daughters.

Discography

Albums

Extended plays

Singles

Guest singles

Music videos

References

External links
Official website

1985 births
Living people
Musicians from Norman, Oklahoma
American country singer-songwriters
American women country singers
Country musicians from Oklahoma
Show Dog-Universal Music artists
University of Oklahoma alumni
Singer-songwriters from Oklahoma
21st-century American singers
21st-century American women singers